Bell-Bottom George is a 1943 black and white British comedy musical film, directed by Marcel Varnel, starring George Formby and Anne Firth. A wartime morale booster, it features the songs, "Swim Little Fish", "It Serves You Right", "If I Had A Girl Like You" and "Bell Bottom George." Future Carry On star Charles Hawtrey appears in a small role.

The film title derives from the Bell bottom trousers which form part of the Royal Navy uniform.

Plot
Anti-British agents plan an attack on a Royal Navy ship.

Jim Bennett is a sailor who has overstayed his shore leave. He explains he was a boxer and if hit in one side he sleeps for 24 hours but if hit on the other he wakes.

Meanwhile, George Blake (Formby) serves drinks to officers in a gentlemen's club. They chastise him for his poor service and say he should join the Navy. George retires to his room in the club where he chats to his goldfish Egbert.

During an air raid George is out with Jim and for various reasons is wearing his uniform. Jim gets knocked out and is trying to "revive" him by hitting him on the other side. The military police spot him and think he is both attacking Jim and that he is absent without leave. From then he is mistaken for the absent Jim. He has borrowed his to go to a Lock-in at a pub. George is spotted by military police who think he is AWOL and escort him back to Naval barracks.

He impresses the sailors there with his song "It Serves You Right - You Shouldn't Have Joined" whilst playing ukulele, and is chosen to play at the "Spick and Span" troop radio concert in London. He meets Pat, a Wren, here, and they start to fall in love. He takes her to a dance and sings "If I Had a Girl Like You" to her.

In the same period, he stumbles on the aforementioned pair of Nazi spies using a taxidermists shop as a front, and foils their plot to blow up a British submarine, "The Firefly". He also impresses and wins the heart of Pat (Anne Firth), the Wren he has fallen for.

When the real Bennett fully recovers in hospital ne panics that he is absent without leave and runs into the two military police who have been harassing the false Bennett. George passes and they give chase. He meets Pat in a car and they think they have escaped, but the group chasing them flag down a police car. They drive to harbour and steal a small launch but the others also steal a boat and the chase continues until George's boat is wrecked.

Sample gag
George is reduced to his underwear by the bad guys and complains he cannot walk around the streets like that as he would be mistaken for Gandhi.

Cast
 George Formby as George Blake
 Anne Firth as Pat
 Reginald Purdell as Birdie Edwards
 Peter Murray-Hill as Shapley
 Manning Whiley as Church
 Hugh Dempster as White
 Dennis Wyndham as Black
 Charles Farrell as Jim Bennett
 Eliot Makeham as Johnson
 Peter Gawthorne as Admiral Sir William Coltham
 Jane Welsh as Rita
 Harry Fowler as Delivery Boy
 Ian Fleming as Lt. Commander Carter
 Charles Hawtrey as BBC Radio Man
 Frank Atkinson as Harry, the Barman

Box office and reception
According to trade papers, the film was a success at the British box office in 1944.

Halliwell's Film Guide called it a "formula star comedy, too long and too familiar". TV Guide commented: "an overlong launching for an unseaworthy production"; while in the opinion of 
The Spinning Image "there are a few laughs to be had."

External links

References

1943 films
1943 musical comedy films
British black-and-white films
British musical comedy films
Films directed by Marcel Varnel
Films set in England
British World War II propaganda films
Films with screenplays by Edward Dryhurst
Films set in London
1940s English-language films